The Apostolic Nunciature to Venice was an ecclesiastical office of the Catholic Church to the Republic of Venice, Italy. It was a diplomatic post of the Holy See, whose representative is called the Apostolic Nuncio with the rank of an ambassador. The office ceased to exist when the Republic lost its independence after it was conquered by Napoleon Bonaparte on 12 May 1797 during the First Coalition.

References

Venice
Apostolic Nuncios to the Republic of Venice